Alex Bevilaqua (born 29 October 1996) is an Australian cricketer. He made his first-class debut for Western Australia in the 2017–18 Sheffield Shield season on 8 February 2018. In May 2019, he was signed by Tasmania ahead of the 2019–20 season.

References

External links
 

1996 births
Living people
Australian cricketers
Western Australia cricketers
Cricketers from Perth, Western Australia